Josef Dachs (30 September, 1825 – 6 June, 1896) was an Austrian pianist and music teacher born in Regensburg. He received his music education from Simon Sechter and Carl Czerny, worked as a concert pianist and premiered many of his own works. He became professor at the Vienna Conservatory in 1850. Among others, he taught Vladimir de Pachmann, Isabelle Vengerova, Hugo Wolf, Ferdinand Löwe and Russian pianist and composer Josef Rubinstein (1847-1884). Hans Rott composed a work for string orchestra, Dachs-Studien, the main melodic theme of which is based on the letters D A C H S. Dachs died in Vienna.

Dachs appeared under Franz Liszt's baton at the inaugural concert of the Mozart Centenary Festival in Vienna on 27 January, 1856 (the exact centenary of Mozart's birth), as soloist in Mozart's Piano Concerto no. 24 in C minor (K.491). The performance was attended by Emperor Franz Joseph I and Empress Elisabeth of Austria. Robert Volkmann dedicated his Konzertstück for piano and orchestra, op. 42, to Dachs.

External links
Biography
https://imslp.org/wiki/Dachs-Studie_(Rott%2C_Hans)

1825 births
1896 deaths
Austrian classical pianists
Male classical pianists
Academic staff of the University of Music and Performing Arts Vienna
Piano pedagogues
19th-century classical pianists
19th-century male musicians
19th-century musicians